Deng Yalan (Chinese: 邓娅兰; pinyin: Dèng Yǎlán; born April 24 in Yunnan) is an elite Chinese gymnast. As of 2014, she represents the Guangxi province in domestic competition. Her best event is vault.

Junior career
In 2013, Deng won bronze on vault at the Chinese National Championships, and silver on vault at the Chinese National Games later that year. The following year, she repeated her silver on vault and placed tenth with her team.

Competitive history

References

External links 
Deng Yalan at Fédération Internationale de Gymnastique

1999 births
Chinese female artistic gymnasts
Living people
Gymnasts from Jiangxi
Gymnasts from Yunnan